The Blood Stain (Spanish:La Mancha de Sangre) is a 1937 Mexican drama film directed by Adolfo Best Maugard and starring Estela Inda, José Casal and Heriberto G. Batemberg. It had serious problems with the Mexican censors due to its portrayal of prostitution. The film's sets were designed by the art director Mariano Rodríguez Granada.

Cast
 Estela Inda 
 José Casal
 Heriberto G. Batemberg
 Manuel Dondé
 Lorenzo Diaz Gonzalez
 Elvira Gosti
 Chico Mabarak
 José Muñoz 
 Luis Santibanez
 Diego Villalba

References

Bibliography 
 Daniel Biltereyst & Roel Vande Winkel. Silencing Cinema: Film Censorship Around the World. Palgrave Macmillan, 2013.

External links 
 

1937 films
1937 drama films
Mexican drama films
1930s Spanish-language films
Films about prostitution in Mexico
Films set in Mexico City

Mexican black-and-white films
1930s Mexican films